The 2022–23 Campeonato Nacional Feminino (also known as Liga BPI for sponsorship reasons) is the 38th edition of Campeonato Nacional Feminino. Benfica is the defending champion.

Following the consecutive reduction of teams, the competition was reduced to 12 teams and played in a home-away league. This format removed the North and South series, used until the previous year.

Teams

12 teams contest the Campeonato Nacional de Futebol Feminino in 2022–23.

Braga
Clube de Albergaria
Famalicão
Länk Vilaverdense
Valadares Gaia
Amora
Atlético Ouriense
Benfica
Marítimo
Sporting CP
Torreense
S.F. Damaiense

Group phase

References

External links 
 official website (fpf)

2022–23
Por
women's
Camp